Martin Blunden  is a British firefighter. He was the Chief Officer of the Scottish Fire and Rescue Service until he stepped down in 2022.

Fire Service Career History 
Martin joined the Fire and Rescue Service with Buckinghamshire Fire and Rescue Service in 1992 as a Retained Duty System (part time on call) Firefighter serving at the local station in the community he grew up in before becoming a Whole time Duty System firefighter in 1994. He served at High Wycombe, Beaconsfield (Day Crewing) and Great Holm in Milton Keynes being appointed as Leading Firefighter (1997), Sub Officer (1998), Station Officer (2001), Assistant Divisional Officer (2003) and Divisional Officer II (2004).  

Martin was seconded to Government on behalf of the Chief Fire Officers Association (CFOA) and was the project manager for the UK establishment, training, roll out and implementation of the New Dimension High Volume Pump capability. He later took on a wider water safety and water rescue remit and, along with Martin Bills of Nottinghamshire Fire & Rescue Service is responsible for introducing the Team Typing concept now used in the UK for Water and Flood Rescue (https://www.bing.com/search?q=martin+blunden+new+dimension+team&pc=EMMX04&mkt=en-gb&first=11&FORM=PERE1).

In 2006, Martin transferred on promotion to Area Manager A to Hereford and Worcester Fire and Rescue Service where he served as the District Commander for Malvern and the strategic lead for specialist rescue.  Whilst he was there is set up and led the Critical Incident Debriefing Team.  Critical Incident Stress Debriefing is a seven-phase, small-group crisis intervention technique using a structured discussion of a significant traumatic event, commonly referred to as a critical incident e.g. fire fatality in order to support staff with their mental health.  

In 2008, Martin was promoted to Area Manager B and transferred to on promotion to Hertfordshire Fire and Rescue Service where he was Head of ICT, Performance & Business Support, Technical Services, Training & Development. 

In 2015, Martin joined South Yorkshire Fire and Rescue Service, serving first as Assistant Chief Officer and then as Deputy Chief Fire Officer (January 2017) where, working for the National Fire Chiefs Council, he helped establish the National Operational Learning system for reporting and sharing operational learning across the UK Fire and Rescue Service, and chaired the inaugural UK wide National Operational Learning User Group for 2 years. In 2020, Martin took on the national (UK) Health & Safety lead for the National Fire Chiefs Council (https://www.nationalfirechiefs.org.uk/NFCC-lead-officers).

Martin was appointed as the Chief Officer of the Scottish Fire and Rescue Service in January 2019 and retired on 31st August 2022.

Fire Service Career Highlights
He is experienced at delivering change programmes and restructures to improve organisational performance and deliver efficiencies. Over the last 29 years, he has gained wide ranging experience of the fire & rescue service both as an operational officer, the National Resilience Officer for the Chief Fire Officers Association (2008), working for and with the Department for Communities and Local Government (DCLG) for fire and rescue services in England and Wales where he delivered key elements of the National Resilience Programme (2004-06).  He has also worked in the Home Office where he was the national lead for the fire and rescue service on the Joint Emergency Services Interoperability Programme (JESIP), authoring the first version of the Joint Doctrine (2013-14).   

Martin is recognised as an accomplished and visible leader who builds strong foundations and relationships, bringing new ideas and forming strong sustainable bonds with other emergency services and this has been demonstrated in his contribution to some of the key UK pan-regional incidents.   A lot of his work leading national teams has also received recognition. This includes two Deputy Prime Minister’s awards for ‘Excellence in Delivery’ with regards to High Volume Pumps.  Whilst working in Hereford and Worcester Fire and Rescue Service, Martin continued to lead for Water Safety & Rescue for the Chief Fire Officers Association (CFOA) and was part of the team awarded the International Higgins & Langley Award for his contribution to Water Rescue in the UK. This is an internationally acknowledged award which recognises innovation and specialised lifesaving techniques employed in swift-water and flood rescue. , 

In 2010 he led for CFOA, working with DCLG, on the review and establishment of the Enhanced Logistics Support capability, designed for major incidents across the UK.  

He was awarded the Queen's Fire Service Medal (QFSM) for distinguished service in the 2021 New Year Honours.

References

Living people
British firefighters
Year of birth missing (living people)
Recipients of the Queen's Fire Service Medal